The Australian cricket team toured the West Indies  in the 1983–84 season to play a five-match Test series against the West Indies.

The West Indies won the series 3–0 with two matches drawn.  Then West Indies therefore retained the Sir Frank Worrell Trophy.

Wisden said that Australia "were outplayed in every department of the game, sometimes embarrassingly so." The West Indies did not lose a single second innings wicket in any of the five Tests and were only once dismissed for fewer than 300. Australia made more than 300 only once.

The series was enormously successful for Allan Border who was top scorer in half his ten Test innings and scored more than twice as many as anyone else in the team. It also saw the establishment of Wayne Phillips as Australia's first-choice wicketkeeper after Roger Woolley initially looked like taking the job. However veteran Australian players such as Geoff Lawson, Rodney Hogg, Kim Hughes and David Hookes performed poorly.

Australian squad
Australia had just defeated Pakistan 2–0 at home during the 1983–84 season. However this was the first tour the team had undertaken since the retirement of Greg Chappell, Dennis Lillee and Rod Marsh.

The original squad selected were as follows:
Batsmen – Kim Hughes (captain), Allan Border (vice-captain), Greg Ritchie, Steve Smith, Kepler Wessels, Graham Yallop, David Hookes, Wayne Phillips (also backup wicketkeeper)
Fastbowlers – Terry Alderman, Geoff Lawson, Rodney Hogg, Carl Rackemann, John Maguire
Spinners – Tom Hogan, Greg Matthews
Wicketkeepers – Roger Woolley
Support team – Col Egar (manager), Geoff Dymock (assistant manager), Errol Allcot
Selectors – Hughes, Border, Dymock

The selection of the side was generally uncontroversial – all the players had been in good form over the Australian summer, and those that did not play test cricket had played one day games for Australia.

Western Australian all rounder Ken MacLeay had been thought a possible tourist but his form had fallen away during the summer. Spinner Murray Bennett was considered unlucky to not be picked, having been in the Australian squad against Pakistan that summer. Jeff Thomson was overlooked despite an excellent domestic season.

Former test bowler turned journalist Bill O'Reilly thought Bob Holland, then Australia's leading leg spinner, should have been taken because of the success of leg spinners on West Indian wickets. Holland had a better domestic record than Matthews that summer but was not as skilled with the bat. (The bowling of Bennett and Holland would later deliver Australia a rare test victory over the West Indies the subsequent Australian summer.)

David Hookes had not played for the Australian test side for a while but was in the one day team and had toured the West Indies before, and his experience was thought to be useful considering the retirements of Chappell, Lillee and Marsh.

Roger Woolley, the first choice wicketkeeper, was the first Tasmanian based player to be picked for Australia since Laurie Nash in 1931. Rod Marsh had been Australia's wicketkeeper since the 1970–71 summer, so Woolley had the chance to establish himself in that role long term. His main rival for the position had been New South Wale's Steve Rixon. Australian selectors had indicated their preference for Woolley by sending him on the tour to Sri Lanka in 1983, and he had scored 532 first class runs at an average of 44.5 that summer. Woolley:
For the next three months I've a job to do as a batsman keeper. That's all I'm thinking about for the time being.... I was worried about Queenslander Ray Phillips this season – he had taken a lot of catches and I hadn't. Strangely, we were not getting wickets that way and my tally, along with the other Tasmanian fieldmen, was down. But 1 felt the Sri Lankan tour has brought me along and my batting was improving with the responsibility of being Sheffield Shield captain.
The "comeback story" of the Australian squad was bowler Terry Alderman, who had damaged his shoulder in November 1982 while tackling a spectator who had charged on to the ground.

Replacements
Graham Yallop had injured his knee during a one-day international in Australia in 1984 and it was unsure if he would be able to tour so Dean Jones was placed on standby. Rod McCurdy was announced as a backup if any bowlers were injured. Steve Smith and Greg Ritchie injured themselves during the one-day finals and David Boon and Graeme Wood were placed on standby for them.

Yallop never made the tour and Jones took his place. Kepler Wessels was injured in the West Indies and Graeme Wood flew out to take his place. McCurdy did not tour.

Pre Tour Contractual Dispute
The tour was marked by a contractual dispute between the players and the Australian Cricket Board. The ACB were worried about players going on "rebel" cricket tours to South Africa. This was resolved after some amendments to the contract.

Criticism of Kim Hughes
There was also the issue of Ian Chappell's constant criticisms of Kim Hughes' captaincy. Hughes had been given the captaincy over Rod Marsh, whom many – particularly Chappell – thought was the superior candidate. At a testimonial dinner for Marsh in February 1984, Chappell, paraphrasing a country and western song, claimed that "Hughes got the goldmine, Marsh the shaft". This resulted in Hughes refusing to participate in pre-game interviews with Chappell at the end of the 1983–84 Australian summer. Hughes:
It was a terribly embarrassing thing in front of a full roll-up of the team. It was more so when 30 or 40 more people came up to me after the dinner and said they disagreed with Ian Chappell's remarks and said that in their opinion I had been doing a good job. I've always said that if you don't have anything good to say about a person you don't say anything at all. I don't have to put up with people who make remarks about me... I have conducted myself, in my belief, beyond reproach. I might be a 'nice guy' but I was certainly embarrassed with my team there at the testimonial and I won't put up with it. If Channel Nine wants Ian Chappell to handle their interviews that's their business, but I won't be any part of it.
Dean Jones later recalled:
It was an awful time to play for Australia. Greg Chappell, Rod Marsh and Dennis Lillee had just retired from Test cricket and South African cricket officials, like Dr Ali Bacher, were lingering around trying to induce players to play in South Africa on an unauthorised tour. I was the first player to reject Bacher's $200,000 tax-free offer and my teammates hated me for it. Players had their own agendas. Our team culture was pathetic and most players were very selfish.

Tour
Hughes was upbeat at the beginning of the tour:
We are not going to win Tests against their pace attack by just playing shots – we must physically defend our wickets right from one to 11. The experienced ones know the need – and newcomers like Steve Smith and Dean Jones have learned quickly. You only have to recall Dean Jones, without a helmet, advancing down the wicket to confront Michael Holding to see the spirit in the side... A big factor is that I think we are a fitter line-up than the Windies after their Australian tour. And how much longer can Clive Lloyd keep going too?... We go as underdogs – I think that's an advantage... We haven't won a series overseas since 1975 and this is a tough challenge for us. But there is no doubting the cricket ability in the squad – but we must cope with conditions arising out of living away from home. They know they have to consider a total of 350 to 400 runs every time we go to the crease.

Early games

Australia vs Leeward Islands
Australian began the tour well with a comfortable victory over Leeward Islands in which Wessels scored over 200 runs and Rackemann took nine wickets. During the game Wayne Phillips and Greg Ritchie over slept and missed training; they were fined by their teammates.

Australia vs Guyana
The Australians dominated their next match, a drawn game against Guyana, in which Steve Smith leapt into test contention by scoring a century in each innings; Tom Hogan also pressed his claims for the spinner's spot by taking seven wickets. (Some writers felt that Smith's form made him good enough to displace Wayne Phillips.)

The game was marred by conflict between Geoff Lawson and a local umpire over a decision and minor injuries to Woolley and Lawson; Peter McFarline also questioned the uninspiring captaincy of Allan Border, who was in charge during that game.

The early good form of the Australian squad plus injuries to Malcolm Marshall and Michael Holding led to some optimistic forecasts. Cricketer writer Peter McFarline wrote that "the Australians, to a man, are confident they can win both [the first test and one day international], even though the odds against them in local eyes are substantial."

1st ODI

For the first one-day international of the tour, Australia decided to bolster their batting by picking Wayne Phillips as the wicketkeeper. Australia wound up losing, due mostly to a century from Desmond Haynes and the off spin bowling of Viv Richards and Larry Gomes. An Australian highlight was a quick 43 from Dean Jones. During the game spectators watched by climbing on the scoreboard; the scoreboard collapsed but no one was seriously injured.

First Test

For the first test it seemed Australia would go with six batsman, a specialist keeper in Roger Woolley, a spinner and three fast bowlers. Wayne Phillips was dropped for Steve Smith, who would open with Kepler Wessels. Greg Ritchie and David Hookes occupied the batting slots that had been taken by Greg Chappell and Graham Yallop over the Australian summer; Tom Hogan was spinner and Lawson, Hogg and Alderman constituted the attack.

However Roger Woolley cracked his right index finger so Australia moved Wayne Phillips down to keeper. Dean Jones was 12th man. The West Indies were without Michael Holding and Malcolm Marshall, meaning the selectors decided to play a spinner, Roger Harper. Both Kim Hughes and Clive Lloyd said before the game that the most likely result would be a draw.
 
Australia were in trouble in the first innings at 9–182 but then Rodney Hogg and Tom Hogan came together and decided to ignore Kim Hughes' instructions to hit out; they combined for a partnership of 97, a record tenth wicket stand for Australia against the West Indies, and took the total to 279.

The West Indies were then dismissed for 230. Half centuries to Allan Border and Phillips rescued Australia from a precarious position enabling Hughes to declare, setting the West Indies 323 to win.

Haynes and Greenidge decided to go for it and put on 250 runs without loss before the game was called off as a draw. The total of 250-0 is still the only Test innings in which all who batted scored a century (Gordon Greenidge 120* and Desmond Haynes 103*).

Geoff Lawson was later fined £150 by the Australian team management for angrily snatching his hat from an umpire Narine after an appeal was turned down.

Kim Hughes controversy
The next game was a tour match against Trinidad & Tobago, which ended in a draw.

Australian captain Kim Hughes was criticised for a show of dissent during the closing stages of the game. He refused to chase 189 runs from 23 overs, playing only two scoring shots in a 75-minute innings. Peter McFarline wrote:
Hughes, who has worked hard to give a new direction to the Australian team since taking over as captain... has lost many supporters... it is a pity the majority of members of this touring side just cannot come to terms with the reality of playing cricket in another country with different styles, beliefs, cultures and characteristics from the ones they are used to... This team fondly believe they are a collection of professional players. On the strength of their performance on Monday, under the leadership of Hughes, they are still strictly amateurs."

2nd ODI

However the Australian team bounced back in the second one-day international, beating the West Indies in a rain-shortened game, due in part to inspired batting by Kepler Wessels.

Second Test

The second test match saw Smith pulled out due to injury, replaced by Dean Jones, who made his test debut. Wayne Phillips was kept as keeper but also had to open. Viv Richards led the West Indies in the place of the injured Clive Lloyd.

Jones later recalled:
On the night of my first Test in Trinidad, I was struck down with the worst virus. My roommate was Geoff Lawson. He rightly said he didn't want me in his room for fear of catching the virus. Our manager at the time, Colin Egar, said the ACB wouldn't pay for another room. So I slept in the corridor outside my room for three nights until I was well. Can you believe a Test cricketer sleeping in the corridor during his first Test?
The game is remembered today chiefly for one of Allan Border's greatest feats with the bat. He scored 98 not out and 100, ensuring Australia escaped with a draw. Two of his partnerships were particularly memorable: a century stand with Dean Jones in the first innings and an undefeated stand of 61 runs with Terry Alderman in the second innings which ensured Australia escaped with a draw. Border hit the last ball of the match for a boundary to bring up his century. Jones later described his first innings score of 48 as his "best knock" in test cricket.

Australia vs Barbados
Kepler Wessells had been injured and flew home. Graeme Wood was flown out as a replacement and played in the next tour game against Barbados. Phillips played as a batsman while Woolley kept.

Australia then drew a tour game against Barbados, with most of the batsmen scoring runs, including David Hookes, who made a century.

Third Test

The turning point of the tour came with the third test. Dean Jones made way for Steve Smith, back in the side from injury, with Phillips still as keeper but pushed back down the order. Graeme Wood replaced an injured Kepler Wessels as opener.

Australia batted extremely well in the first innings, the highlight being Phillips' knock of 120 (including four sixes). At the end of day three the West Indies were 3–301 in reply and it seemed the game was headed for a draw. (Richardson and Greenidge, who both scored centuries, had been dropped early on in their respective innings.) Peter McFarline thought Phillips had batted Australia to a "position from where it cannot lose the match".

However Clive Lloyd then hit 76 off 77 balls, giving the West Indies a lead, Australia collapsed in their second innings and lost the game by ten wickets.

Graeme Wood fractured his finger during the game and had to return home from the tour.

Fourth Test

For the fourth test Australia brought in Roger Woolley as wicketkeeper letting Phillips play as a specialist batsman. Rodney Hogg was injured and missed the game.

Despite a first innings score of 98 from Allan Border, the West Indies won the game easily by an innings. Both Viv Richards and Richie Richardson scored centuries. Roger Woolley dropped Richardson off Lawson's bowling when the batter was only 38.

An Australian positive was the bowling of Carl Rackemann.

Australia vs Windward Islands
Australia then drew a tour game against Windward Islands in which Steve Smith scored another century. David Hookes took three wickets with his off spin.

3rd ODI

Further centuries from Desmond Haynes saw the West Indies comfortably win the third and fourth one day internationals.

4th ODI

Fifth Test

For the fifth test, Australia tried to bolster the bowling by using Greg Matthews as a fifth bowler and playing Phillips as a wicketkeeper again. It did not work and the West Indies won by ten wickets. Steve Smith was injured and could not bat in Australia's second innings.

Conclusion
The tour had been a disastrous one for Australia, despite some encouraging early performances. The only players who could have been said to return with their reputations enhanced were Allan Border and Wayne Phillips; Peter McFarline spoke well of Geoff Lawson and Tom Hogan. McFarline said "Woolley's tour with the gloves has been as poor as I have seen in this class of cricket. It resulted in Wayne Phillips, a man of talent but not yet with the capacity to understand that talent, being placed in the position of keeping as well as opening the batting."

Phillips' relative success as wicketkeeper encouraged the Australian selectors to persist with him in that position for the next two summers with ultimately disastrous consequences for Phillips' career and the Australian team.

Australia's senior players were seen to have let them down: Hughes, Hookes, Rackemann, Hogg. Kim Hughes' failures with the bat were instrumental in him resigning the captaincy in November 1984. Allan Border later remembered:
By the end of the tour Kim was really feeling the pinch. At one stage we were in Jamaica, at Montego Bay, and we'd had the day off and been on the beach. We came back to the team hotel and there's Kim, half cut watching the Donald Duck show or something with his hair all braided and with those coloured balls hanging off. I thought then: 'Kim, you've lost the plot."'
Ian Chappell, a long time critic of Hughes' captaincy, later wrote:
Hughes has suffered a string of defeats as Australia's captain on foreign soil but this latest one makes his job of trying to drag the side up by his bootstraps an impossible one, and I think the ACB has to offer the job to Allan Border.
Dean Jones said the team had poor culture:
An example of the bad culture within our team came when one of our front-line bowlers got very upset when he didn't get the new ball. He was furious that he was selected to bowl first change. This particular bowler took our first wicket for the match. When everyone ran in to congratulate him, he threw a haymaker punch at our captain, Kim Hughes. When asked to explain his actions by Hughes, the bowler's response was, I got a wicket for ya, and walked back to his mark. Oh yes, things were very different than.
However at the time there were many positive reports about the Australian team culture. Peter McFarline called the squad "the fittest tourists for many years, perhaps ever." It was the first tour by physiotherapist Errol Alcott, who became an integral part of the side.

References

External links
Australia tour of West Indies 1983/84 at Cricinfo

International cricket competitions from 1980–81 to 1985
1983-84
West Indian cricket seasons from 1970–71 to 1999–2000
1984 in West Indian cricket
1984 in Australian cricket